This page provides the summaries of the matches of the qualifying tournaments divided into three groups, two of six teams and one of five teams. The winners and runners-up of each group met in a play-off match to qualify for the 1980 Summer Olympics tournament held in Moscow. Three teams qualified – Kuwait, Malaysia and Iran. However, due to the American-led political boycott, Malaysia and Iran did not enter the Final Tournament and were replaced by Iraq and Syria respectively.

Qualifying tournaments

Group 1
The qualifying tournament of group 1 was held in Iraq, 5 teams participated.

Round 1

Playoff match

Kuwait won the tournament and qualified for the 1980 Summer Olympics football tournament.

Group 2
The qualifying tournament of group 2 was held in Malaysia, 6 teams participated.

Round 1

Playoff match

Malaysia won the tournament and qualified for the 1980 Summer Olympics football tournament.

Note: Due to the American-led political boycott, Malaysia who qualified did not enter the Final Tournament and were replaced by Iraq.

Group 3
The qualifying tournament of group 3 was held in Singapore, 6 teams participated.

Round 1

Playoff match

Iran won the tournament and qualified for the 1980 Summer Olympics football tournament.

Note: Due to the Islamic Republic regime political boycott and IRGC terorrism political, Iran who qualified did not enter the Final Tournament and were replaced by Syria.

References

External links
 Football Qualifying Tournament (Moscow, Soviet Union, 1980) - Zone Asia - rsssf.com

Asia
1980